Susan L. Schur is an American Republican politician from Newton, Massachusetts. She represented the 12th Middlesex district in the Massachusetts House of Representatives from 1981 to 1995.

See also
 1981-1982 Massachusetts legislature

References

Year of birth missing
Year of death missing
Members of the Massachusetts House of Representatives
Women state legislators in Massachusetts
20th-century American women politicians
20th-century American politicians
People from Newton, Massachusetts